Claudia Lee Black (born 11 October 1972) is an Australian actress, best known for her portrayals of Aeryn Sun in Farscape, Vala Mal Doran in Stargate SG-1 and Sharon "Shazza" Montgomery in the film Pitch Black. She has had prominent roles in video games, such as Chloe Frazer in Uncharted, Morrigan in Dragon Age, Admiral Daro'Xen and Matriarch Aethyta in Mass Effect and Tess Everis in Destiny and Samantha Byrne in Gears of War 3, Gears of War 4, and Gears 5. She also had a recurring role as Dahlia in The Originals and starred as Dr. Sabine Lommers in The CW's Containment.

Early life
Black was born and raised in a Jewish family in Sydney, New South Wales. She studied at the Anglican Kambala School in Sydney. She has lived in Australia, New Zealand, Spain, the United Kingdom, Canada and the United States. Her parents are medical academics based in Australia, Jules and Judy Black.

Career
Black has acted in Australia and New Zealand in television and movies. She portrayed a transgender woman named Jill Mayhew in the Australian television series Good Guys, Bad Guys. She had a leading role in the New Zealand soap opera City Life playing the role of Greek lawyer Angela Kostapas.

Black gained international recognition for her role in Farscape, and was nominated for a Saturn Award in the Best Actress category in 2001, 2002 and 2005, winning in the latter. She has appeared in the feature films Queen of the Damned and Pitch Black. After Farscape ended, Black appeared as Vala Mal Doran in the Stargate SG-1 episode "Prometheus Unbound"; her performance was well-received and she was invited to reprise her role in the show's ninth season when series regular Amanda Tapping went on maternity leave. Black returned to the series as a regular cast member for the tenth and final season, and also starred in Stargate: The Ark of Truth and Stargate: Continuum, films which wrapped up the series' story lines. Black co-starred with Ben Browder in both series.

In the NBC TV show Life (2007), Black was cast in the supporting role of Jennifer Conover for the initial pilot. Due to Black's second pregnancy, the part was recast and the role was given to the actress Jennifer Siebel when the series was bought by the TV network. NBC still used footage of Black, and none of Siebel, when promoting the TV series' debut.

Popular at science fiction conventions, Black showed her talent at singing and playing the guitar at the Farscape conventions, and in 2007 sang on the debut album of musician and fellow Farscape actor Paul Goddard.

Black has also performed in theater. She played Portia in a tour of the Merchant of Venice. She has had parts in Spotlight on Women, The Picture of Dorian Gray, Loose Ends and Pick Ups for the Belvoir street theatre; Little Women and The World Knot for the Bicentennial Opera.

Since 2007, Black has been a prolific video game voice actress. She has gained particular attention for her work with BioWare's Dragon Age and Mass Effect series. Her son Odin Black voiced her Dragon Age character's son in Dragon Age: Inquisition. She also played Chloe Frazer in the Uncharted series. In 2008, she narrated the audiobook "Swallowing Darkness" by Laurell K. Hamilton. In 2014, Black had a voice-over role in Rick and Morty as Ma-Sha in the episode "Raising Gazorpazorp". In 2016, she appeared in Call of Duty: Infinite Warfare as Engineer Audrey "Mac" MaCallum.

Filmography

Film

Television

Video games

Awards
 2009 – The Constellation Awards, Best Female Performance in a 2008 Science Fiction Film, TV Movie, or Mini-Series: Stargate: Continuum
 2007 – The Constellation Awards, Best Female Performance in a 2006 Science Fiction Television Episode: Stargate SG-1: "Memento Mori"
 2004 – Saturn Award, Best Actress, Farscape: The Peacekeeper Wars

References

External links

 
 

1972 births
Living people
Actresses from Sydney
Australian film actresses
Australian television actresses
Australian video game actresses
Australian voice actresses
Jewish Australian actresses
20th-century Australian actresses
21st-century Australian actresses
People educated at Kambala School